This is a List of San Diego Historical Landmarks in La Jolla. In 1967, the City of San Diego established a Historical Resources Board with the authority to designate and protect the city's landmark buildings and structures.  In total, the city has designated more than 850 structures or other properties as historical landmarks. This list includes details on the 106 San Diego Historical Landmarks located in the La Jolla and Torrey Pines areas.  Four of the properties have also received recognition at the federal level by inclusion on the National Register of Historic Places and one—the George H. Scripps Memorial Marine Biological Laboratory—by designation as a National Historic Landmark.

The sites designated as landmarks include numerous structures designed by early Modern architect Irving Gill.  Also included is the Torrey Pines Area and several sites connected to La Jolla's long association with scientific research, including the George H. Scripps Memorial Marine Biological Laboratory and the Salk Institute for Biological Studies.

Listing

See also

 National Register of Historic Places listings in San Diego County
List of San Diego Historic Landmarks in the Point Loma and Ocean Beach areas
 List of San Diego Historic Landmarks (1-150)

References

External links

 Sandiego.gov: official List of Historical Landmarks Designated by the San Diego Historical Resources Board

La Jolla
 La Jolla
La Jolla
La Jolla Landmarks
San Diego, La Jolla